Ivan Vekić (born 19 July 1998) is a Croatian handball player who plays for Bordeaux Bruges Lormont Handball.

Career
Vekić started his handball career in his hometown club RK Metković. At Metković he spent twelve years before joining RK Medveščak.  With RK Zagreb, Vekić played EHF Champions League  and SEHA League.

Honours

RK Poreč
Croatian Premier League
Bronze medal (1): 2021

RK Zagreb
Croatian Premier League
Champions (1): 2018

Bordeaux Bruges Lormont Handball
N1 Elite
Champions (1): 2022

Individual
Croatian Premier League - Best goalkeeper of the 2020/2021 season - 34,3% (208 saves in 18 matches)

References

Living people
1998 births
Croatian male handball players